Vézelin-sur-Loire is a commune in the Loire department in central France. It was established on 1 January 2019 by merger of the former communes of Saint-Paul-de-Vézelin (the seat), Amions and Dancé.

See also
Communes of the Loire department

References

Communes of Loire (department)